Mkamzee Chao Mwatela (born 1982) is a Kenyan director, writer and actor, notable for her roles in the TV series Mali and Stay.

Early life 
Mkamzee attended the Nairobi Primary School. She later joined the renowned Moi Nairobi Girls’ School for her secondary education and then on to Saint Mary's for the International Baccalaureate programme. She majored in theatre arts.

After three years on stage (2003 to 2006), she finally joined the State University of New York in Buffalo to study film and theatre.

Filmography

References

External links

1982 births
Living people
Kenyan television actresses
Kenyan film actresses
21st-century Kenyan actresses
People from Nairobi